Omar Jesús Merlo (born 12 June 1987) is an Argentine-born Chilean professional footballer that currently plays for Peruvian club Curicó Unido as a centre back.

Merlo made his first team debut for Colón in 2006, and  quickly established himself as a regular member of the first team squad. In February 2008, he signed up with powerhouse team River Plate, where he won the Torneo Clausura. Seasons later, Merlo was a key player at the squad of Primera División club Huachipato that earned 2012 Torneo Clausura, scoring the winning penalty in the final.

Personal life
Merlo naturalized Chilean by residence when he was a player of Huachipato.

Honours

Club
River Plate
 Torneo Clausura (1): 2008 Clausura

Huachipato
 Primera División de Chile (1): 2012 Clausura

 Sporting Cristal

 Peruvian Primera División (1): 2020
 Copa Bicentenario (1): 2021
 Torneo Apertura (1): 2021
 Torneo Clausura; runner-up: 2020

References

External links
 
  Argentine Primera statistics
 Merlo at Football-Lineups

1986 births
Living people
Footballers from Santa Fe, Argentina
Argentine footballers
Argentine expatriate footballers
Argentine emigrants to Chile
Naturalized citizens of Chile
Chilean footballers
Association football defenders
Argentine Primera División players
Club Atlético Colón footballers
Club Atlético River Plate footballers
Primera B Metropolitana players
Club Atlético Platense footballers
Chilean Primera División players
Unión San Felipe footballers
C.D. Huachipato footballers
Peruvian Primera División players
Sporting Cristal footballers
Argentine expatriate sportspeople in Chile
Expatriate footballers in Chile
Argentine expatriate sportspeople in Peru
Chilean expatriate sportspeople in Peru
Expatriate footballers in Peru